Namibia–United Kingdom relations are the bilateral relations between Namibia and the United Kingdom. Both nations are members of the Commonwealth of Nations and the United Nations.

History
During the Scramble for Africa, while present-day Namibia was occupied by Germany and known as German South West Africa, the United Kingdom occupied Walvis Bay and incorporated the port area to its possession in the Cape Colony. In 1890 the British government apportioned the Caprivi Strip to the Germans. This would give Germany access to the Zambezi River and its other East African territories, and it would give up its claims on Zanzibar (which was transferred to the United Kingdom). 

In 1915, during World War I, troops from South Africa invaded and occupied the territory. After the war, with the signing of the Treaty of Versailles, Germany was forced to transfer its territory to the Union of South Africa in 1920, which at the time was a self-governing dominion of the British Empire. The territory would be called South West Africa for the next 70 years. South West Africa was not allowed to be annexed by South Africa, rather it was governed as a mandated territory.

In 1961, South Africa became a republic and continued to govern Namibia under its Apartheid rule. In 1966, SWAPO launched an armed struggle against South African occupation which became known as the South African Border War. In 1977, the UK joined the Western Contact Group a diplomatic effort aimed to bring an internationally acceptable transition to independence for Namibia. In September 1978, the UK voted for the United Nations Security Council Resolution 435 which proposed for a cease-fire and UN-supervised elections in South African-controlled South West Africa which ultimately led to the Namibia's independence in exchange for the withdrawal of Cuban troops from Angola during the Border war. In 1989, UN observed elections were held and Namibians overwhelmingly voted for SWAPO and independence. In April 1989, British Prime Minister Margaret Thatcher paid a visit to the country, the very day when hostilities on all sides of the conflict where to formally cease.

In 1989, the United Kingdom established a British Liaison Office in Windhoek. In March 1990, Namibia gained its independence from South Africa and immediately afterwards the UK recognized and established diplomatic relations with Namibia and converted its Liaison Office to a high commission. That same year, Namibia opened a high commission in London.

In October 1991, Queen Elizabeth II paid an official visit to Namibia and met with President Sam Nujoma. There would be several high level visits between leaders of both nations. In June 2016, UK Minister for Africa, James Duddridge, paid a visit to Namibia with a purpose on bolstering bilateral relations and expanding trade links with the nation.

Trade 
In 2022, bilateral trade between Namibia and the United Kingdom totaled $139 million USD. Namibia's main export products to the UK include: wood and cork; mechanical power generators; vegetables and fruit; general industrial machinery and meat and meat preparations. The UK's main export products to Namibia include: vehicles and cars; medicinal and pharmaceutical product; textile fabrics and plastics in primary forms.

Resident diplomatic missions
 Namibia has a high commission in London.
 United Kingdom has a high commission in Windhoek.

See also 
British diaspora in Africa

References

 
United Kingdom
Bilateral relations of the United Kingdom
Relations of colonizer and former colony